Manitoba Provincial Road 354 is a provincial road in the southwestern section of the Canadian province of Manitoba.

Route description
PR 354 begins at PTH 10 and PR 262 at Onanole, and terminates at the Canadian National Railway main line near Bradwardine.

From PR 270, PR 354 turns north for  before turning west through the community of Crawford Park. The road then continues west for  before meeting southbound PR 250. The road continues west for another  before turning south at the unincorporated community of Horod. The two roads run in concurrence for  before PR 470 turns west and leaves the concurrence. The two roads run in concurrence for  before PR 354 leaves the concurrence and continues south, traveling  to meet PTH 24 east of Oak River. PTH 24 and PR 354 continue in concurrence west for  through Oak River before PR 354 leaves the concurrence just west of the village and continues south, traveling  to its southbound terminus.

The route is gravel for most its length, with a paved section covering the first  from its northern terminus along with the concurrence it shares with PTH 16 and PTH 24.

History
In the early 1990s, the Manitoba government decommissioned a number of provincial secondary roads and returned the maintenance of these roads back to the rural municipalities. A portion of the original PR 354 was included in this decommissioning. However, unlike most provincial roads in which the length was shortened or the route decommissioned altogether, PR 354 was slightly lengthened from its original distance.

Prior to this, PR 354's northern terminus was at Horod with PR 359. The road extended another  past its current southern terminus to meet eastbound PR 259. The two roads continued in a western concurrence for  before turning south, traveling  through Bradwardine before PR 259 turned west and left the concurrence.

After the decommissioning of the original section, PR 354 was rerouted east onto the former PR 359, which was significantly shortened from its original length. The road traveled on this section to meet PR 270.

PR 270 was initially extended on to the section between PR 354's current northern terminus and the current junction between the two roads; it was changed to PR 354 in 1997. This section includes the former PR 263, which was decommissioned in its entirety.

The section between PR 259 and its old southbound terminus was redesignated as PR 564. The section between PR 259 and PR 354's current southern terminus is now a municipal road.

References

354